The Fistulinaceae are a family of fungi, the best-known member of which is the beefsteak fungus Fistulina hepatica. Molecular studies have now shown it to lie within the Agaricales.

See also
List of Agaricales families

References

External links

 
Agaricales families
Taxa named by Johannes Paulus Lotsy
Taxa described in 1907